= Raes Jamil Bhurgari =

Pakistani politician

Raes Jamil Bhurgari MPA

Member of the Provincial Assembly of Sindh
- In office 2013–2015

Raes Jamil Bhurgari (1952 – 2015) was a Pakistani politician who served as a member of the Provincial Assembly of Sindh.
